Vitus is a French bicycle manufacturer best known for its steel cycle frame tubing, and its frames built with aluminium tubes joined to aluminium lugs by bonding - a construction method the company pioneered in the late 1970s.

Frames
Compared to modern aluminium bicycle frames, early Vitus aluminium frames, such as the 979, offered more comfort because of the small diameter of the tubes. As a result, the frames lacked some degree of lateral stiffness compared to their steel counterparts.

The Vitus 992 improved on the 979 design by pinching the aluminum tubes into an ovoid shape at certain critical places, greatly improving stiffness.

In the early 1980s, Vitus began producing frames using carbon fiber tubing, but did so in keeping with the company's method of using small diameter tubing and bonding lugs.

The company later expanded its product offering with carbon fiber semi-monocoque frames (made with more than one monocoque element), like the ZX-1. The ZX-1 was one of the first monocoque carbon fiber bikes made.

Since being purchased by WiggleCRC group  Vitus bikes became a direct-to-consumer brand selling exclusively on Chain Reaction Cycles and Wiggle websites.

Frame tubing
Vitus also supplies tubing to other bicycle manufacturers.

Location
It is based near St. Etienne, France.
It has manufacturing in Cambodia.

References

External links 
 official site
 Schutt article
 Highflange article

Cycle parts manufacturers
Cycle manufacturers of France
French brands
Mountain bike manufacturers